Louis Fortin (1 December 1920 – 24 June 2005) was a Progressive Conservative party member of the House of Commons of Canada. He was born in Lévis, Quebec and became a lawyer by career.

He unsuccessfully attempt to unseat Jean Lesage at the Montmagny—L'Islet riding as an independent candidate in the 1957 federal election. Lesage resigned from Parliament in June 1958 to serve as Quebec's provincial Liberal leader. Fortin won a byelection at Montmagny—l'Islet on 29 September 1958 and served for the remainder of the 24th Canadian Parliament. Jean-Paul Cook of the Social Credit Party defeated Fortin in the 1962 election after which Fortin did not campaign again for a House of Commons seat.

External links
 

1920 births
2005 deaths
20th-century Canadian lawyers
Independent MPs in the Canadian House of Commons
Members of the House of Commons of Canada from Quebec
People from Lévis, Quebec
Progressive Conservative Party of Canada MPs